CSS Bombshell — believed to have been an Erie Canal steamer — was a U.S. Army transport. Bombshell was sunk by the Confederate batteries in Albemarle Sound, North Carolina on April 18, 1864. She was raised by the Confederate forces and taken into the Confederate States Navy under the command of Lieutenant Albert Gallatin Hudgins, CSN. Bombshell was captured at the Battle of Albemarle Sound by USS Mattabesett and USS Sassacus on May 5, 1864 and sent to New York City.

References

Bombshell
1864 ships
Ships captured by the United States Navy from the Confederate States Navy
Maritime incidents in April 1864